Alexander Alexandrovich Kruber (– December 15, 1941) was a Soviet geographer, professor, the founder of the Russian and Soviet karstology.

Alexander Kruber was born in Istra (formerly Voskresensk), Russia. He graduated from the Moscow University in 1897. He became chairman of the Geography Department of the Moscow University in 1919 and director of the Scientific Research Institute of Geography during 1923-1927. Since 1927 he could no longer work due to grave health problems.

He studied karst structures of the East European Plain, Crimea, and Caucasus.

A mountain ridge on the Iturup Island (Kruber Ridge), a karst cavity in the Qarabiy yayla plateau (Караби-яйла), Crimea, and a karst cave in Caucasus (Krubera-Voronya Cave) are named after him.

Books
 Гидрография карста, М., 1913
 Карстовая область горного Крыма, М., 1915
 Общее землеведение, 5 изд., ч. 1—3, М., 1938

External links
 

Russian geologists
Russian geographers
Soviet geologists
1871 births
1941 deaths